We Rock: Drum King is a music video game developed by Arc System Works and published by 505 Games for the Wii. In the United States, the game is co-branded by rock music magazine Rolling Stone, and known as Rolling Stone: Drum King.

Gameplay
The game simulates the playing of drums with players either using the Wii Remote and Nunchuk or two Wii Remotes for control. Following a scrolling runway similar to music games such as Guitar Hero, players gesture their appropriate controller in time to the music and prompts that appear on screen.

Soundtrack
All songs in the game are cover versions.

"All Star" - Smash Mouth
"Banquet" - Bloc Party 
"Be My Baby" - The Ronettes
"Blister in the Sun" - Violent Femmes
"Born to Be Wild" - Steppenwolf
"By the Way" - Offcutts
"Can't Get Enough" - Bad Company 
"Can't Stand Losing You" - The Police 
"Cissy Strut (instrumental)" - The Meters 
"Click Click Boom" - Saliva 
"Direction" - The Starting Line 
"Feel Good Inc." - Gorillaz
"Fight the Good Fight" - Triumph 
"I Fought the Law" - The Clash 
"In Too Deep" - Sum 41 
"Let There Be Drums" - The Ventures  
"Lifestyles of the Rich & Famous" - Good Charlotte 
"Mickey" - Toni Basil 
"No One Knows" - Queens of the Stone Age 
"On Top of the World" - Boys Like Girls 
"Pull Me Under" - Dream Theater 
"Saturday Superhouse" - Biffy Clyro 
"She Sells Sanctuary" - The Cult 
"Song 2" - Blur 
"Spoonman" - Soundgarden
"Stay With Me" - Faces 
"The Take Over, the Breaks Over" - Fall Out Boy 
"The Final Countdown" - Europe 
"We Will Rock You" - Queen

References

2009 video games
505 Games games
Arc System Works games
Band-centric video games
Drumming video games
Multiplayer and single-player video games
Music video games
Video games developed in Italy
Wii games
Wii-only games